Jean-Pierre "Jempi" Monseré (8 September 1948 – 15 March 1971) was a Belgian road racing cyclist who died while champion of the world.

Career

Early life 
As a child, the energetic Monseré excelled in different sports like football and athletics. He rode his first bicycle race in Lendelede at the age of 12, competing against fifteen-year-old cyclists.

Monseré won his first official race on July 7, 1963, in the Sint-Elooi Prize in Ruddervoorde. He managed to put this race completely in his hands and he finished with a lead of no less than 7 minutes. At 15, Monseré, already targeted by several competitors, won the Belgian Road Championship for under-novices.

In 1965, Dr. Derluyn joined the staff of Jean-Pierre Monseré. Under his guidance, "Jempi" switched from the then popular training methods, consisting of endless endurance training, to interval training. As a result, training had to be done less and they could build more peace, so a rider had much more recuperation.

Amateur career 
Monseré became amateur cyclist in 1967. In the Belgian Road Championship, he and Roger De Vlaeminck were considered as favourites. But their rivalry both cost them the title with Monseré ending second.

The following year, he again finished as second in the Belgian Road Championship.

Following his victory in the mountain race GP Peugeot, Monseré was included in the Belgian national team for the 1968 Summer Olympics as a support rider for Roger De Vlaeminck. After De Vlaeminck crashed in a training ride, Monseré could ride for himself and finished in 6th place in the individual road race.

Once more, Monseré ended as second in the 1969 Belgian Road Championship. In his last World Amateur Championship, he hoped to win the world title in Brno, Czechoslovakia. However, the Dane Leif Mortensen was crowned world champion. Monseré won the silver medal and compatriot Staf Van Roosbroeck bronze.

Professional career and death 
He became professional for Flandria in 1969, and won the Giro di Lombardia that year, after Gerben Karstens tested positive for taking amphetamines. A year later, Monseré became the Belgian track omnium champion.

Monseré continued to affirm his exceptional qualities, including his self-discipline and hunger for victory. He owed a lot to the strong bond with his blind masseur Jacques Delva, who, among other things, let him perform the basic yoga asanas.

He was selected in the Belgian team for the 1970 World Championship in Leicester, England. In the final, Eddy Merckx encouraged Monseré to chase the leading cyclists, saying 'if you want to win, you have to go to Gimondi'. Monseré escaped with a small group and eventually won the world championship. He was the second-youngest world champion after another Belgian, Karel Kaers. 

In 1971, he was again Belgian track champion, this time in the madison discipline. On the road, he won the Vuelta a Andalucía in February 1971. 

On 15 March 1971, Monseré was riding the Grote Jaarmarktprijs in Retie after being convinced by Eric and Roger De Vlaeminck to participate. Monseré realised it was good training for Milan–San Remo the following weekend. On the road from Lille to Gierle, he and Roger De Vlaeminck agreed they had trained enough and they were about to exit the race. However, a car driving onto the course collided head-on with Monseré killing him outright. His funeral was attended by more than 20,000 people, including several government ministers, and top cyclists including Eddy Merckx, Roger De Vlaeminck, Patrick Sercu and Joop Zoetemelk. Merckx placed the flowers he had received after his Milan–San Remo victory on the coffin. In a cruel twist of fate, in 1976 Monseré's seven-year-old son Giovanni died after a collision with a car, while riding his racing bike which was given to him on his first communion by a family friend, another world champion Freddy Maertens. Like his father, the little boy was also wearing a rainbow jersey.

Aftermath 

Investigation of the accident showed blunders of both the local law enforcement forces and the race organization. As it was a small local race, the gendarmerie had refused to cooperate, and the police did not find it necessary to stop traffic on the course. Moreover, other than a car driving in front, there were no other signs warning that a race was ongoing. The driver of the car, a woman in her twenties, was not blamed. Following the accident, the regulations related to cycling races at all levels were tightened.

In a documentary years later, Roger De Vlaeminck stated that "Merckx would have had a lot of trouble with him. Monseré was better than him, I think. He was more of an all-rounder. He could sprint and climb very well. He rode … also more reasoned than Merckx and me. In my view, he had to do less to achieve the same results."

Jean-Pierre Monseré is remembered each year with a memorial cycle trophy, the Grote Herdenkingsprijs Monseré, organized by the Retiese Wielerclub 'De Zonnestraal'. Jempi Monseré's medals are in the Belgian national cycle museum in Roeselare.

Major results

Road 
1966
 2nd  Belgian National Road Race Championships, Under-23 road race
1967
 1st Stage 1 Ronde van Limburg Amateur race
 2nd  Belgian National Road Race Championships, Amateur road race
 5th Ronde Van Vlaanderen Beloften
 1968
 1st Elfstedenronde Amateur race
 1st Trophée Peugeot
 Belgian National Road Race Championships
 2nd  Amateur road race
 3rd  Amateur interclubs road race
 6th Road race, Olympic Games
 1969
 1st Giro di Lombardia
 1st Omloop der Vlaamse Gewesten Amateur race
 1st Omloop Het Volk Amateur race
 2nd  Road race, UCI Amateur Road World Championships
 2nd  Belgian National Road Race Championships, Amateur road race
 2nd Coppa Ugo Agostoni
 2nd Circuit de Wallonie
 3rd Kampioenschap van Vlaanderen
 6th Grand Prix de Fourmies
 1970
 1st  Road race, UCI Road World Championships
 1st Stage 1 Paris–Luxembourg
 Vuelta a Andalucía
1st Stages 2 & 4 
 1st Omloop der Zuid-West-Vlaamse Bergen
 1st Zomergem – Adinkerke
Four Days of Dunkirk
 1st Stage 1 (TTT)
 2nd Kampioenschap van Vlaanderen
 2nd Bruxelles–Meulebeke
 2nd Omloop van de Grensstreek
 2nd Omloop van de Leievallei
 2nd Omloop van het Houtland
 2nd GP Roeselare
 3rd  Road race, National Road Championships
 4th Critérium des As
 4th Druivenkoers Overijse
 6th Tour of Flanders
 8th Gent–Wevelgem
 8th La Flèche Wallonne
 10th Paris–Roubaix
1971
 1st  Overall Vuelta a Andalucía
1st Stages 1 & 3 
 2nd Omloop van het Zuidwesten
 9th Circuit des Onze Villes
 10th Kuurne–Brussels–Kuurne

Track 

1967
1st  National Track Championships, Amateurs Team pursuit (with Ronny Van Marcke, Rudy Serruys and Armand Van Wijnsberghe)
1968
1st  National Track Championships, Amateurs Team pursuit (with Ronny Van Marcke, Christian Callens and Rudy Serruys)
1970
1st  National Track Championships, Omnium
 1st Six Days of Ghent (with Patrick Sercu)
 1st Omnium of Antwerp (with Patrick Sercu and Roger De Vlaeminck)
 1st Omnium of Milan (with Eddy Merckx)
 1st Omnium of Ghent, October (with Patrick Sercu)
 2nd Omnium of Ghent, January (with Roger De Vlaeminck and Erik De Vlaeminck)
1971
1st  National Track Championships, Madison (with Patrick Sercu)
 1st Omnium of Brussels (with Eddy Merckx, Roger De Vlaeminck and Ferdinand Bracke)
2nd Six Days of Antwerp (with Dieter Kemper and Julien Stevens)

Honours 

 A monument in Lille in 1971.
 :nl:De Dood van een Sandwichman, a 1972 film documentary by Robbe de Hert and Guido Henderickx.
 A street, Jean-Pierre Monseréstraat in Roeselare and a road, Monseréweg in Lille.
 Museum KOERS in Roeselare in 1998
 Grote Prijs Jean-Pierre Monseré, from 2012.
 A statue in Roeselare in 2021

Books 

 De dood van Jempi by Jan Emiel Daele in 1972, 89 p. (Dutch) 5950991
 Jempi – Getuigenissen over wereldkampioen 1970 by Manu Adriaens and Eddy Brouckaert in 1986, 95 p. (Dutch) 
 Jean-Pierre Monseré, voor altijd 22 by Mark van Hamme in 2011, 296 p. (Dutch) 
 Monseré by Mark van Hamme in 2020, 120 p. (Dutch)

See also
Curse of the rainbow jersey
List of professional cyclists who died during a race

References

External links
Biographical information at Cycling Hall of Fame

1948 births
1971 deaths
People from Roeselare
Belgian male cyclists
UCI Road World Champions (elite men)
Cyclists who died while racing
Sport deaths in Belgium
Olympic cyclists of Belgium
Cyclists at the 1968 Summer Olympics
Cyclists from West Flanders